The 1962–63 Egyptian Premier League, was the 13th season of the Egyptian Premier League, the top Egyptian professional league for association football clubs. The league consisted of 2 groups made up of 12 clubs. The season started on 28 September 1962 and ended on 5 June 1963.
Tersana managed to win the league for the first time in the club's history.

League table

Group 1

Group 2

Final stage

Championship play-off

Championship play-off matches

Top goalscorers

References

External links 
 All Egyptian Competitions Info

5
1962–63 in African association football leagues
1962–63 in Egyptian football